Venus Williams and Justin Gimelstob defeated Serena Williams and Luis Lobo in the final, 6–4, 6–4 to win the mixed doubles tennis title at the 1998 French Open.

Rika Hiraki and Mahesh Bhupathi were the defending champions, but chose not to compete together. Hiraki played with Paul Kilderry and lost in the third round, while Bhupathi played with Rennae Stubbs and lost in the second round.

Seeds
All seeds received a bye into the second round.

Draw

Finals

Top half

Section 1

Section 2

Bottom half

Section 3

Section 4

External links
 Draw
1998 French Open – Doubles draws and results at the International Tennis Federation

Mixed Doubles
French Open by year – Mixed doubles